The 2005–06 A-League was the 29th season of top-flight soccer in Australia, and the inaugural season of the A-League. After over 12 months without a national professional club competition since the close of the 2003–04 National Soccer League season, the first match in the A-League was played on 26 August 2005. The competition was made up of a triple round robin league stage before a championship playoff featuring the top four teams.

Of the eight participants, four came from the National Soccer League (1977–2004): Perth Glory (established 1995), New Zealand Knights (1999), Newcastle Jets (2000) and Adelaide United (2003). New Zealand Knights had previously entered the NSL as the Auckland Football Kingz, but were significantly restructured and have a vastly different playing roster. Queensland Roar previously competed in the NSL from 1977 to 1988 and had competed in the Queensland State League since then as Brisbane Lions.

Adelaide United were named Premiers after finishing the season seven points clear at the top of the league. The first A-League Grand Final took place on 5 March 2006, with Sydney FC becoming the league's inaugural Champions, defeating the Central Coast Mariners 1–0.

Clubs

Foreign players

The following do not fill a Visa position:
1Those players who were born and started their professional career abroad but have since gained Australian Residency (and New Zealand Residency, in the case of Wellington Phoenix);
2Australian residents (and New Zealand residents, in the case of Wellington Phoenix) who have chosen to represent another national team;
3Injury Replacement Players, or National Team Replacement Players;
4Guest Players (eligible to play a maximum of ten games)

Salary cap exemptions and captains

Preliminary Competitions
Two competitions were held prior to the start of the A-League season.

Oceania Club Championship Qualification

This three-round competition was held in May 2005 to determine Australia's qualifier for the 2005 season of the Oceania Club Championship.  It consisted of all Australian A-League clubs (i.e. all clubs except for the New Zealand Knights) and granted Perth Glory – the reigning NSL champions – a bye into the semi-finals.

Sydney FC qualified for and subsequently won the 2005 Oceania Club Championship entitling it to a place in the 2005 FIFA Club World Championship to be played in Tokyo.

Pre-Season Challenge Cup

The inaugural pre-season cup was held in July and August in the lead up to the start of the A-League season. The competition featured a group stage and a knockout stage. Commentators did not give much weight to the competition as a guide for performance during the season proper, as injuries or club strategic policy ruled that many teams did not use their best players and often used experimental tactics.

Group stage

Finals

The Central Coast Mariners were the inaugural Pre-season Challenge Cup winners.

Regular season
The A-League season commenced on 26 August 2005 with two Friday night fixtures. Games each round were held throughout the weekend, though certain rounds also featured Thursday night games. As there was no concurrent cup competition, midweek fixtures were uncommon unless they were held on Australian public holidays. A three-week break was also scheduled in December to coincide with the 2005 FIFA Club World Cup in Tokyo.

League table

Results

Round 1

Round 2

Round 3

Round 4

Round 5

Round 6

Round 7

Round 8

Round 9

Round 10

Round 11

Round 12

Round 13

Round 14

Round 15

Round 16

Round 17

Round 18

Round 19

Round 20

Round 21

Finals series
After the home and away season, the finals series began, with the top four teams. The finals series used a modified Page playoff system, with the difference that each first-round game would be played over two legs.  The winner of the finals series, Sydney FC was crowned as the A-League champion.  Adelaide United, as the holder of the top position on the league ladder, were named the 2005–06 premiers.

Standard cup rules – such as the away goals rule (two-leg ties only), extra time and penalty shootouts were used to decide drawn games.

Statistics

Attendance

Highest attendance
41,689: Sydney FC vs Central Coast Mariners, 5 March 2006 (grand final)
30,377: Sydney FC vs Adelaide United, 19 February 2006 (Semi-final Leg2)
25,557: Sydney FC vs Adelaide United, 3 February 2006 (Round 21)
25,208: Sydney FC vs Melbourne Victory, 28 August 2005 (Round 1)
23,142: Queensland Roar vs Sydney FC, 23 September 2005 (Round 5)
20,725: Queensland Roar vs New Zealand Knights, 28 August 2005 (Round 1)
18,276: Sydney FC vs Adelaide United, 9 October 2005 (Round 7)
18,206: Melbourne Victory vs Sydney FC, 16 October 2005 (Round 8)
17,960: Melbourne Victory vs Perth Glory, 4 September 2005 (Round 2)

Leading goalscorers

Disciplinary records

Biggest victories

Highest aggregate scores

Other honours

First goal – Carl Veart (Adelaide United vs Newcastle Jets, Round 1)
First hat trick – Ante Milicic (Newcastle Jets vs New Zealand Knights, Round 11)
First red card – Richie Alagich (Adelaide United vs Melbourne Victory, Round 3)

Awards

AFC Champions League
Although Australia became a member of the Asian Football Confederation in 2006, Australian teams were not invited to participate in the 2006 AFC Champions League competition.

The AFC later determined that qualification for the 2007 AFC Champions League would be based on the 2005–06 A-League competition, despite that ACL matches will commence after the completion of the A-League 2006–07 season.  Adelaide as Premiers and Sydney as Champions were the representatives.

See also
2005–06 Adelaide United FC season
2005–06 Central Coast Mariners FC season
2005–06 Melbourne Victory FC season
2005–06 Newcastle Jets FC season
2005–06 New Zealand Knights FC season
2005–06 Perth Glory FC season
2005–06 Queensland Roar FC season
2005–06 Sydney FC season

Notes

References

External links
A-League official website, including fixtures

 
A-League Men seasons
Aus
Aus
1
1